Italiot Greek, also known as Italic-Greek, Salentino-Calabrian Greek or Apulia-Calabrian Greek refers to two varieties of Modern Greek, spoken in Italy by the Griko people.

Italiot Greek refers to the Greek varieties spoken in some areas of southern Italy, a historical remnant of the ancient colonisation of Magna Graecia. There are two small Griko-speaking communities known as the Griko people who live in the Italian regions of Calabria, the southern tip of the Italian peninsula, and in Apulia, its south-easternmost corner. These varieties too are believed to have developed on the basis of an originally Doric ancient dialect, and have preserved some elements of it, though to a lesser extent than Tsakonian. They subsequently adopted influences from ancient Koiné, but became isolated from the rest of the Greek-speaking world after the decline of Byzantine rule in Italy during the Middle Ages. Among their linguistic peculiarities, besides influences from local Romance languages, is the preservation of the infinitive, which was lost in the modern Greek of the Balkans.

The dialects are:
 Griko, spoken in Salento
 Calabrian Greek, spoken in southern Calabria

Varieties of Modern Greek
Magna Graecia
Endangered diaspora languages
Endangered Indo-European languages
Languages of Apulia
Languages of Calabria
Greece–Italy relations